The 1990–91 season was the 45th season in Rijeka's history and their 29th season in the Yugoslav First League. Their 6th place finish in the 1989–90 season meant it was their 17th successive season playing in the Yugoslav First League. This was also the last season in which Croatian clubs participated in the Yugoslav league.

Competitions

Yugoslav First League

Classification

Results summary

Results by round

Matches

First League

Source: rsssf.com

Yugoslav Cup

Source: rsssf.com

Squad statistics
Competitive matches only.  Appearances in brackets indicate numbers of times the player came on as a substitute.

Notes
1. Data for league attendance in most cases reflects the number of sold tickets and may not be indicative of the actual attendance.

See also
1990–91 Yugoslav First League
1990–91 Yugoslav Cup

References

External links
 1990–91 Yugoslav First League at rsssf.com
 Prvenstvo 1990.-91. at nk-rijeka.hr

HNK Rijeka seasons
Rijeka